Bohdan Milovanov (born 19 April 1998) is a Ukrainian footballer who plays for Portuguese club Arouca as a right back.

Club career
Born in Luhansk, Milovanov moved to the Community of Madrid at early age and made his senior debut with Alcobendas CF during the 2014–15 season, in Tercera División. In July 2015, he moved to Getafe CF and returned to youth football.

On 10 August 2017, after being sparingly used by Getafe's reserves, Milovanov signed for Segunda División B side UD San Sebastián de los Reyes. On 9 July of the following year, he joined another reserve team, Sporting de Gijón B also in the third division.

Milovanov made his debut for the Asturians' first team on 14 January 2020, starting in a 1–0 home win against Elche CF in the Segunda División championship.

References

External links

1998 births
Living people
Footballers from Luhansk
Ukrainian footballers
Association football defenders
Segunda División players
Segunda División B players
Tercera División players
Getafe CF B players
UD San Sebastián de los Reyes players
Sporting de Gijón B players
Sporting de Gijón players
F.C. Arouca players
Ukrainian expatriate footballers
Ukrainian expatriate sportspeople in Spain
Expatriate footballers in Spain
Ukrainian expatriate sportspeople in Portugal
Expatriate footballers in Portugal
Ukraine under-21 international footballers